Soulganic is an independent Fusion trio that is based in Charlotte, North Carolina. Soulganic liberally infuses Soul, Latin, Funk, Rock, Blues and Jazz elements into its music. The band consists of Cory McClure (drums, keyboards), Ryan McKeithan (acoustic and electric guitars, vocals), and Anthony Rodriguez (lead vocals, bass guitar).

Discography

External links
 Official site

American blues musical groups
American funk musical groups
American soul musical groups